Quiet Ferocity is the third studio album by Australian indie rock band the Jungle Giants, released on 7 July 2017 through Amplifire Music. The album peaked at number 11 on the ARIA Charts, becoming the band's highest charting album.

Frontman Sam Hales said "For Quiet Ferocity we found a studio close to home and treated it like a job, clocking on and off everyday, and because I was producing it as well everything was quicker – there was no middle man. There was a certain flow to it, it's like we found our tempo, the particular speed we like to work at." Hales later added "We were so excited to get this record out because we'd been sitting on it for a couple of months."

The album was support by a national tour between August and September 2017.

At the AIR Awards of 2018, the album won Best Independent Album or EP.

At the 2018 Queensland Music Awards, the album won Album of the Year.

Critical reception

 
Jessica Dale from The Music wrote that "Sam Hales and co have created a fun, jangly release that surely holds hits that will see you through to the warm summer months." adding tracks like 'People Always Say' and 'Time and Time Again' show maturity and growth in The Jungle Giants sound and it's easy to hear that producing the works themselves has influenced their updated sound."

Triple J called the album "groove fuelled", adding the band have "ended up with ten sleek dance rock tracks".

Brooke Hunter from Girl magazine felt that "Quiet Ferocity has that easy listening vibe that reminds you of summer road-trips", adding "All the songs have that infectious happy-feel that keeps you wanting more."

Track listing

Charts

Release history

References

2017 albums
The Jungle Giants albums
Albums produced by Sam Hales
Albums produced by Konstantin Kersting